Cionosicys is a genus of the gourd family.

Species 
Cionosicys excisus (Griseb.) C.Jeffrey
Cionosicys macranthus (Pittier) C.Jeffrey
Cionosicys pomiformis Griseb.

References

External links 

Cucurbitaceae genera
Cucurbitoideae